The 1st Air Wing is a wing of the Japan Air Self-Defense Force. It comes under the authority of the Air Training Command and resides in Shizuoka Prefecture.

History

Formation 
The 1st Air Wing was formed in 1 December 1955.

Organisaion 
As of 2017 it has two squadrons, both equipped with Kawasaki T-4 aircraft:
 31st Training Squadron
 32nd Training Squadron
It is currently based at Hamamatsu Air Base in Shizuoka Prefecture.

References

Units of the Japan Air Self-Defense Force